The Vander Zalm ministry was the combined Cabinet (formally the Executive Council of British Columbia) that governed British Columbia from August 6, 1986, to April 2, 1991. It was led by Bill Vander Zalm, the 28th premier of British Columbia, and consisted of members of the Social Credit Party.

The Vander Zalm ministry was established in part-way through the 33rd Parliament of British Columbia, after premier Bill Bennett stepped down and Bill Vander Zalm was elected as his successor. Following the 1986 election, it continued to govern through the 34th Parliament of British Columbia, until Vander Zalm stepped down in 1991. It was succeeded by the Johnston ministry.

List of ministers

Ministers of state

Cabinet composition and shuffles 
Vander Zalm was sworn into office on August 6, 1986, inheriting Bennett's cabinet; he said he would assemble a new cabinet to be sworn in the next week. During this time, two cabinet ministers resigned their posts: Jack Heinrich and Robert McClelland.

On August 14, Vander Zalm unveiled his new cabinet. Only three ministers were named to replace the four departed ones, with the Ministry of Lands, Parks and Housing dissolved and its responsibilities split to accommodate the reduced cabinet size. Vander Zalm said his reduced cabinet should be taken "as a clear sign of less government … I expect that over a period of time, a reduction in the size of government will continue where appropriate." The three ministers joining cabinet were Jack Davis as minister of energy, mines and petroleum resources; Rita Johnston as minister of municipal affairs; and Bill Reid as minister of tourism. Notably, the three were also the only Socred MLAs to support Vander Zalm's leadership bid from the beginning. Grace McCarthy, third-place finisher in the 1986 party leadership election, moved from provincial secretary to economic development, and was additionally made deputy premier; Claude Richmond moved to social services and housing; Jack Kempf took over forests and lands; Anthony Brummet was named to education; and Jim Hewitt was appointed to agriculture and fisheries. Vander Zalm himself took the finance portfolio, to provide a "hands on" approach to financial and economic development, but added that he only intended to hold the role "as long as it takes." Meanwhile, Brian Smith (runner-up in the 1986 leadership election), Pat McGeer, Russ Fraser, Alex Fraser, Garde Gardom, Terry Segarty and Elwood Veitch all retained their existing portfolios.

Following the government's re-election in the 1986 election, Vander Zalm initiated a major shuffle on November 6. Two more ministries — the Ministry of International Trade, Science and Investment; and the Ministry of Consumer and Corporate affairs — were dissolved, with their responsibilities being incorporated into other ministries; almost every ministry's responsibilities were reorganized to accommodate this. Seven new members were added to cabinet, including five who were newly elected: Mel Couvelier, John Savage, Peter Dueck, Stan Hagen and Lyall Hanson. Vander Zalm said that the number of newly elected ministers would be an advantage, as they would bring an "open-minded approach" to their ministries and to cabinet. Couvelier was appointed minister of finance. McCarthy lost her title of deputy premier, which was eliminated, but gained responsibility for international trade. Notably absent were Bud Smith, Kim Campbell and John Reynolds, all unsuccessful leadership candidates; however, Stephen Rogers, another leadership candidate, joined cabinet as minister of environment and parks. The new cabinet consisted of 17 ministers.

Throughout 1987, the Vander Zalm ministry saw several ministers resign due to allegations of conflicts-of-interest. On March 3, Rogers offered his resignation as environment minister; Vander Zalm accepted his resignation, but moved him to a new portfolio instead of dropping him from cabinet. Rogers was named to intergovernmental affairs, replacing Bruce Strachan, who in turn took over Rogers' old portfolio. Days later, on March 7, Kempf resigned as forests minister as Vander Zalm announced an internal investigation into "financial irregularities" in the ministry; Savage took over as acting minister until March 31, when Dave Parker was named the new minister. On July 24, Stan Hagen announced his resignation as minister of advanced education in response to a conflict-of-interest investigation; Brian Smith took over on an interim basis. Hagen was reinstated as minister on August 6, after the report found he was violated guidelines but not the B.C. Constitution Act. On November 13, Cliff Michael resigned as transport minister after admitting to a "perceived conflict of interest"; he was replaced by Rogers.

In September 1987, Vander Zalm announced a plan to decentralize provincial government with the creation of eight regional districts to administer various government services. Vander Zalm also said that each region would be represented by a "minister of state" in the cabinet, who would have responsibility for co-ordinating economic development and government services in said region.

In mid-1988, the ministry was rocked by two high-profile resignations. On June 28, attorney general Brian Smith resigned from cabinet. Smith said his resignation was because Vander Zalm did not adequately respect the independence of his office, citing two instances of meddling, and that Vander Zalm was planning to split the ministry into two. Elwood Veitch became acting attorney general. One week later, on July 6, Grace McCarthy resigned from cabinet, also in protest of Vander Zalm's leadership and the interference of "arrogant" civil servants in the premier's office.

Amidst the two resignations, Vander Zalm announced a major shuffle and restructuring of his government on July 6. Three new ministries were created: the Ministry of Regional Development, the Ministry of International Business and Immigration, and Solicitor General. Regional development and international business split the responsibilities of the eliminated Economic Development portfolio, while solicitor general assumed the responsibility for policing and corrections from the attorney general's office. Eight backbenchers were promoted to cabinet: Howard Dirks (crown lands), Terry Huberts (parks), John Jansen (international business), Cliff Michael (government management services, returning to cabinet), Angus Ree (solcitor general), Bud Smith (attorney general), Neil Vant (transportation) and Jack Weisgerber (native affairs); one minister, Stephen Rogers, was dropped from cabinet. Ultimately, the ministry expanded to 22 members. It was, to that point, the largest cabinet in BC history.

On September 21, 1989, Bill Reid resigned from cabinet after allegations of embezzlement; he was replaced as tourism minister by Claude Richmond.

On November 1, 1989, Vander Zalm announced another major shuffle that he called a "cabinet for the '90s". Three ministers — Huberts, Ree and Vant — were dropped, and five were added: Carol Gran (government management services and women's programs), Russ Fraser (solicitor general, returning to cabinet), Norm Jacobsen (labour and consumer services), Ivan Messmer (parks) and John Reynolds (environment). Of the 17 ministers who remained in cabinet, eleven changed responsibilities while six stayed put: Brummet (education), Couvelier (finance), Davis (energy), Savage (agriculture), Smith (attorney general) and Weisgerber (native affairs). Notably, Vander Zalm scrapped all the ministers of state titles, citing concerns about cabinet ministers being involved in regional matters; instead, Hagen took lead on the regionalization program as minister of regional development. After the shuffle, the cabinet stood at 22 ministers.

The ministry faced two more resignations through 1990. On May 30, Dueck resigned from cabinet amidst a growing expenses scandal in his ministry; Jacobsen temporarily took over as social services minister. On July 12, Bud Smith stepped down from cabinet, under fire for allegedly meddling in a private prosecution. Solicitor general Russ Fraser stepped in as acting attorney general, becoming the first non-lawyer to hold the role in decades.

On December 13, 1990, Vander Zalm shuffled his cabinet once more. Calling back to his last shuffle, he called the new lineup "a cabinet for the 21st century." Most notably, Bud Smith returned to cabinet as minister for regional and economic development. Fraser continued as attorney general, with Messmer taking his role as solicitor general. Jacobsen was named to social services and housing, to fill the gap left by Dueck's resignation. Three new members joined: Harry de Jong (agriculture), Jim Rabbitt (labour and consumer services) and Cliff Serwa (environment). Only one member was dropped from cabinet: Anthony Brummet, who had previously announced he would not be running for re-election. After the shuffle, the cabinet counted 23 members. The Times Colonist noted that this was Zalm's fifth major cabinet shuffle, and that 32 ministers had gone through cabinet since the 1986 election.

On March 6, 1991, Mel Couvelier quit cabinet in protest, saying he "couldn't sit beside" Vander Zalm while the latter was under investigation for conflict-of-interest. He was replaced as finance minister by Elwood Veitch.

On March 28, 1991, Jack Davis, minister of energy, mines and petroleum resources, died in office.

Notes

References

Citations

Sources 

Politics of British Columbia
Executive Council of British Columbia
1986 establishments in British Columbia
Cabinets established in 1986
1991 disestablishments in British Columbia
Cabinets disestablished in 1991